Ni Xia Lian (born 4 July 1963) is a Chinese-born table tennis player who represents Luxembourg since 1991. She was born in Shanghai, and resides in Ettelbruck.

Career
Ni won team and mixed doubles gold medals for China in the 1983 World Table Tennis Championships. She moved to Germany in 1989 and settled in Luxembourg two years later. Her husband, Tommy Danielsson, is her coach and training partner. She competed at the 2008 Summer Olympics, reaching the third round of the singles competition. She qualified for competition at the 2012 Summer Olympics in the Women's singles competition. She lost 4–2 to 16-year-old Ariel Hsing from the US in the 2nd round in the London games.

She competed for Luxembourg at the 2016 Summer Olympics in Rio de Janeiro in the women's singles competition. She lost 4–2 to Feng Tianwei of Singapore in the 3rd round. She was the flag bearer for Luxembourg during the closing ceremony.

When she qualified for the 2020 Summer Olympics at the age of 58, Ni became the oldest Olympian table tennis player.

In 2021, Ni, 58 years old, won the women's doubles bronze medal for Luxembourg (LUX) in 2021 World Table Tennis Championships alongside Sarah de Nutte.

See also
 List of table tennis players
 List of World Table Tennis Championships medalists

References

External links

1963 births
Living people
Luxembourgian female table tennis players
Table tennis players at the 2000 Summer Olympics
Table tennis players at the 2008 Summer Olympics
Table tennis players at the 2012 Summer Olympics
Table tennis players at the 2016 Summer Olympics
Olympic table tennis players of Luxembourg
Chinese expatriates in Germany
Chinese emigrants to Luxembourg
Table tennis players from Shanghai
Table tennis players at the 2015 European Games
Table tennis players at the 2019 European Games
European Games medalists in table tennis
European Games bronze medalists for Luxembourg
Chinese female table tennis players
Naturalised table tennis players
Naturalised citizens of Luxembourg
People from Ettelbruck
Table tennis players at the 2020 Summer Olympics
World Table Tennis Championships medalists